The Reformed Baptist Fellowship is a group of churches which adhere to the 1689 Baptist Confession of Faith in south India.

Churches in the Fellowship 
 Reformed Baptist Church, Salem-636008, Tamil Nadu, South India
 Evangelical Baptist Church, Madurai-625005, Tamil Nadu, South India
 Trinity Tamil Baptist Church, Keerambur-637207, Tamil Nadu, South India
 Grace Evangelical Church, Malayoor-622301, Tamil Nadu, South India
 Grace Reformed Baptist Church, Kolli Hills-637411, Tamil Nadu, South India
 Reformed Baptist Church, Hanur-571439, Karnataka, South India
 Reformed Baptist Church, Pudukottai-622001, Tamil Nadu, South India
 Reformed Baptist church, Coimbatore-641045, Tamil Nadu, South India
 Good Shepherd Reformed Baptist Church, Yercaud-636601, Tamil Nadu, South India
 Grace Reformed Baptist Church, Pennadam-606105 
 Grace Evangelical Church, P.Kulavaipatti, Karambakudi- 622301,  Pudukkottai 
 Reformed Baptist Church, Vinukonda, Guntur( District), Andhra Pradesh- 522647
https://www.google.co.in/maps/place/Grace+Evangelical+Church/@10.4034558,79.0054016,15z/data=!4m5!3m4!1s0x0:0x5033a7ec7047ff6b!8m2!3d10.4034558!4d79.0054016

References

External links
 Official Website of Reformed Baptist Fellowship of India
 Official Website of Reformed Baptist Church, Salem
 Official Website of Evangelical Baptist Church Madurai

Baptist denominations in India